The Work and the Story is a 2003 Mormon mockumentary comedy film written and directed by Nathan Smith Jones and starring Nathan Smith Jones, Jen Hoskins, Eric Artel, Dan Merkley, and Richard Dutcher. The title of the film is a reference to the Mormon-oriented film The Work and the Glory.

Plot
The story takes place just after the fictional disappearance of Richard Dutcher, famous for beginning the current Mormon cinema phase with his work God's Army.  After Dutcher's disappearance the film follows the journeys of three amateur filmmakers who are eager to take his place as the first "Mormon Steven Spielberg".  One of these filmmakers doesn't want to see Dutcher found.

Production
Richard Dutcher donated the 16mm film stock to make the film. This is the same stock (three years-old) that God's Army was going to be shot on, had Dutcher not found the financing to shoot on 35mm.

External links
 
 
 The Work and the Story at LDSFilm.com
 

2003 films
Mormon cinema
2003 comedy films
Films about film directors and producers
Films set in Utah
Films shot in Utah
American mockumentary films
2000s English-language films
2000s American films